Motława is a river in Eastern Pomerania in Poland. The source is in Szpęgawskie Lake, northeast from the town of Starogard Gdański. It goes through Rokickie Lake to Martwa Wisła, a branch of the Vistula. The total length of the river is estimated at 68 km, with an area of 1511.3 km².

The city of Gdańsk is situated at its mouth in the Martwa Wisła. In Gdańsk, the Motława ferry crosses the river, a service that has run since the year 1687.

The Polish name Motława is derived from the Old Prussian language. In German the river is known as Mottlau.

A common theory for the etymology of the cities Gdańsk and Gdynia is that they are named after an older Polish and Kashubian name for the river, Gdania.

References

External links

Rivers of Poland
Rivers of Pomeranian Voivodeship
1Motława